is a Japanese anime franchise created by Yoh Yoshinari and produced by Trigger. The original short film, directed by Yoshinari and written by Masahiko Otsuka, was released in theaters in March 2013 as part of the Young Animator Training Project's Anime Mirai 2013 project, and was later streamed with English subtitles on YouTube from April 2013. A second short film partially funded through Kickstarter, Little Witch Academia: The Enchanted Parade, was released in October 2015. 

An anime television series aired in Japan between January and June 2017, with the first 13 episodes available on Netflix worldwide beginning in June 2017. The remaining 12 episodes of its first season was labeled as the show's second season and was made available on the platform in August 2017. Two manga series have been published by Shueisha.

Story
Having been inspired by a witch named Shiny Chariot, a girl named Atsuko "Akko" Kagari enrolls at Luna Nova Magical Academy to become a witch, but struggles due to her non-magical background. This all changes when she discovers the Shiny Rod, a powerful magic relic left behind by Chariot.

One of the main themes in the franchise is Akko trying to live up to Shiny Chariot's ideals by showing the world that magic is still a wonderful thing, while Luna Nova struggles for its continual existence because the general public regards wizardry as outdated. In the TV series, this background element is expanded into a plotline in which magic is waning across the world. The secret to restoring the flow of magic lies within the forbidden Arcturus Forest, sealed inside a magical locale named the Grand Triskellion erected by the Nine Olde Witches, the legendary founders of the academy.

The key to undoing the seal lies in a sequence of seven magical words and the Shiny Rod, an artifact which reacts only to the wielder's genuine desire to spread joy and happiness. When Akko gains possession of the Rod, Chariot (secretly one of her Luna Nova teachers and the Rod's previous wielder) tries to guide her on the path to restoring the power of magic to the world. However, Croix, Chariot's former best friend, had also coveted – and was denied – the power sealed within the Grand Triskellion due to her selfish ambitions. As a result, she schemes to unlock the Grand Triskellion by force with use of artifacts powered by negative emotions she developed with her technomagical abilities and try to deter both Akko and her rival along the way.

Characters

Akko is an energetic, optimistic, but very impulsive Japanese girl who attends Luna Nova after being inspired by the witch Shiny Chariot. Having come from a non-magical background, she struggles using magic much of the time, and is disappointed by the mundanity of her classes as opposed to Chariot's more spectacular performances. However, her unshakable belief in magic and her genuine desire to use it for good enables her to wield the Shiny Rod, which accepts her as its new master, and gradually discover her own magical talent.

Akko's friend and roommate, a kind and soft-spoken Finnish witch who worries about Akko's well-being. She has orange hair and wears lower-framed glasses. Her magical specialty involves summoning and communicating with fairies and spirits residing in old, well-used items.

Akko's other friend and roommate, a cynical, mischievous witch from the Philippines who specializes in brewing potions with various bizarre effects. She often uses Akko as a test subject, or to help her in gathering the poisonous or hazardous ingredients (mushrooms in particular) she needs.
 

 is an astrology teacher at Luna Nova whose real identity is Chariot du Nord, a famous witch and alumni of Luna Nova who performed under the alias  and inspired Akko to become a witch. Her chosen mission was to use her magic skills to bring joy to people's hearts. She mysteriously disappeared from the public eye ten years ago after her former friend Croix tricked her into employing a sinister type of magic, which stripped Akko of her latent magical powers as a child. Now living and teaching incognito at Luna Nova, she takes Akko as a personal student after she notices her strong desire to become a witch, which enables her to use the Shiny Rod and unseal the lost seven words to the Grand Triskellion, in order to make up for her guilt.

The top student of Luna Nova who is greatly admired by her classmates and teachers alike. She has light blue eyes and blond hair. Hailing from Great Britain as daughter of a declining noble family of witches, she has a serious and arrogant nature and oftentimes clashes with Akko, whom she holds in disdain for her impulsive nature and admiration of Shiny Chariot. Despite this, Diana is secretly a childhood fan of Chariot herself, and gradually develops a grudging respect for Akko.

A delinquent Luna Nova witch student from the United States who has a penchant for stealing priceless artifacts and magical objects that catch her fancy. She excels at dancing and performing aerobatic stunts on her broomstick.

A silent, grumpy-looking German Luna Nova witch student who combines magic with machinery such as robots and laser guns, which are typically forbidden on the school premises. In the TV series, she has even set up a secret workshop in a disused part of the academy, which can only be entered by means of her own bed.

A friendly and laid-back Luna Nova witch student from Russia who has a passion for food and is always seen snacking on something, even during classes. She specializes in culinary magic.

The main villainess of the television series. A new teacher at Luna Nova Magical Academy who specializes in technomagic. She was once close friends with Chariot and previously helped her in searching for the Grand Triskellion's words, but grew spiteful towards her over not being chosen to wield the Shiny Rod.

Media

Manga
A one-shot manga based on the anime, drawn by Terio Teri, was published in Shueisha's Ultra Jump magazine on August 19, 2013. Another manga by Teri, featuring an original story, was serialized in Ultra Jump between August 19, 2015 and November 20, 2015, and was compiled in a single tankōbon volume released on January 19, 2016.

Another series illustrated by Yuka Fujiwara, began serialization in Shueisha's Ribon magazine from September 3 to December 28, 2015. Shueisha released a compiled tankobon volume on February 25, 2016.

Anime

Short films
Little Witch Academia was produced by Trigger as part of the Young Animator Training Project's Anime Mirai 2013 project, which funds young animators, alongside other short films by Madhouse, Zexcs and Gonzo. The short was created and directed by Yoh Yoshinari and written by Masahiko Otsuka with music by Michiru Ōshima. The short, along with the other Anime Mirai shorts, opened in 14 Japanese theatres on March 2, 2013. Trigger later released the short on Niconico and with English subtitles on YouTube and Crunchyroll on April 19, 2013. The YouTube version received over 850,000 views up until it was taken down in August 2013 to promote the Blu-ray release. The short was later released on region-free Blu-ray Disc on October 24, 2013.

On July 5, 2013, Trigger announced at Anime Expo that a second short film, titled Little Witch Academia: The Enchanted Parade, would be developed in response to the reception the first short received. The project began production in 2014 following the airing of Kill la Kill. Whilst initially having the funds for a twenty-minute episode, Trigger launched a Kickstarter campaign to extend its runtime to fifty minutes. The Kickstarter was launched on July 9, 2013 and met its $150,000 USD goal within five hours, finishing with a total of $625,518. The short premiered at Anime Expo 2015, and was made available for Kickstarter backers on July 3, 2015 before it was subsequently released in Japanese theaters on October 9 of that year. Both films were later released on Netflix with an English-language dub on December 15, 2015. However, both films were removed from Netflix on October 9, 2019.

Television series

An anime television series of Little Witch Academia was announced on June 24, 2016 following the final episode of Space Patrol Luluco. The series aired in Japan between January 9, 2017 and June 26, 2017. The series ran for 25 episodes released across nine BD/DVD volumes. Netflix began streaming the first 13 episodes with an English dub as of June 30, 2017. The remaining 12 episodes began streaming as of August 15; but they were labeled as the show's second season.

During interviews, Yoshinari said he wishes to create a second season that explores the history of characters like Diana Cavendish and Amanda O'Neill. The director also wants to create an anime spin-off series focused on the witch Shiny Chariot. He even suggested that the Night Fall (or Naito Foru) books in the anime might work as a standalone anime series. During an interview, Yoh Yoshinari stated that he and Trigger had been planning a second season for a year, with them ultimately falling through, leading to Yoshinari directing BNA: Brand New Animal.

Video game

A video game developed by A+ Games and published by Bandai Namco Entertainment, titled , was released on PlayStation 4 on November 30, 2017 in Japan, followed by a PS4 and Steam release in North America in early 2018. A bonus game, is available in Japan as a pre-order bonus.

Another video game, this time in form of VR game titled Little Witch Academia: VR Broom Racing by UNIVRS and funded by Kickstarter was announced in Jun 20, 2019. The game was originally planned to be released in June 2020, but ultimately postponed to October 13, 2020 in the light of COVID-19.

Other appearances
A crossover short featuring characters from both Little Witch Academia and Inferno Cop premiered at AnimeNEXT 2015 on June 13, 2015 and was also shown at Anime Expo 2015 on July 2, 2015. Both Akko (in episode 13) and Sucy (episode 8) make guest appearances in Trigger's 2016 anime series Space Patrol Luluco.

More recently, the series appeared in the mobile game Super Robot Wars X-Ω as a limited-time event. The story features Akko and her friends hunting fairies in a forest when they are transported to another world. There, they join the characters of Aura Battler Dunbine and Gurren Lagann in their respective stories while finding their way back to Luna Nova.

Reception 
In 2019, Crunchyroll listed Little Witch Academia in their "Top 100 best anime of the 2010s", describing it as a "charming coming-of-age story". IGN also listed Little Witch Academia among the best anime series of the 2010s. Emily Ashby of Common Sense Media described the series as having strong messages about "self-confidence and perseverance", but warned about scary creatures. Even so, she praised the show's portrayal of "loyalty and craftiness" as positive character traits, and said that the series would "appeal to viewers with a soft spot for underdogs."

References

External links
  
  
 Little Witch Academia short film entry at Anime Mirai 
 
 

2017 anime television series debuts
2010s animated short films
Anime short films
Anime with original screenplays
Coming-of-age anime and manga
Films about witchcraft
Japanese animated fantasy films
2010s Japanese-language films
Kadokawa Shoten manga
Magical girl anime and manga
Netflix original anime
One-shot manga
School life in anime and manga
Seinen manga
Shueisha manga
Shōjo manga
Shōnen manga
Studio Trigger
Toho Animation
Tokyo MX original programming
Witchcraft in anime and manga
Witchcraft in television
Yen Press titles
Witchcraft in written fiction